Adou is a surname. People with this surname include:
Robleh Ali Adou (born 1961), Djiboutian windsurfer
Blaise Dago Adou (born 1985), Ivorian football defender
Mouftaou Adou (born 1991), Beninese football defender
Kelvin Amian Adou (born 1998), French football right-back of Ivorian descent

See also
Liu Shan (207–271), widely known by his infant name Ādǒu (阿斗), second and last emperor of the state of Shu Han during China's Three Kingdoms period